The Rural Municipality of The Gap No. 39 is a rural municipality (RM) in the Canadian province of Saskatchewan within Census Division No. 2 and  Division No. 2.

History 
The RM of The Gap No. 39 incorporated as a rural municipality on December 12, 1903.

Geography

Communities and localities 
The following urban municipalities are surrounded by the RM.

Villages
Ceylon

The following unincorporated communities are within the RM.

Localities
Hardy, dissolved as a village, January 1, 2000

Demographics 

Government 
The RM of The Gap No. 39 is governed by an elected municipal council and an appointed administrator that meets on the second Wednesday of every month. The reeve of the RM is Lorne McClarty while its administrator is Laura Delanoy. The RM's office is located in Ceylon.

References 

The Gap

Division No. 2, Saskatchewan